Michael Joseph Mulkay (born 1936) is a retired British sociologist of science.

Biography
Mulkay worked as a reader and researcher at Aberdeen University  until 1966, he was then lecturer in sociology at Simon Fraser University 1966 to 1969, at the University of Cambridge from 1969 to 1973, and then as Professor of Sociology at the University of York, from which he retired in 2001. A number of his students have gone on to take distinguished academic posts, including Nigel Gilbert, Steve Woolgar, Steve Yearley, Andrew Webster and Jonathan Potter.

Between the scientific positivism of Karl Popper and the revolutionary perspective of the Kuhnian school, Mulkay probably stands on a slightly left ground, follows Robert Merton who has been known partially as the predecessor of Sociology of Scientific Knowledge. He supports the methodological right of sociology to investigate the process of the production of scientific knowledge by means of comparing, illustrating academic influential social circumstance and the informative pattern of individual interaction among scientists who are in debate or cooperation.  To analyse the effect on scientific research from inter-professional communication, Mulkay dedicated the significant book The Word and the World: Explorations in the Form of Sociological Analysis.

In the late 60s and early 70s, Mulkay used Kuhn's and Merton's work, both of which he felt had limitations, to formulate an approach that "opened the way for 'internalist' perspectives in the contemporary sociology of science...his work in part paralleled, and in part preceded the work of the Edinburgh School." He also sought to create a synthesis between Mannheimian sociology of knowledge and Merton's sociology of science. Transforming Kuhn's idea of scientific revolutions, he preferred the concept of rebellion in which "rebels within scientific fields branch out to create new fields,"  rather than transforming an existing field by a so-called Kuhnian paradigm shift. Mulkay therefore forms an important link connecting the early sociology of science of the 60s, as represented by Merton, with the rich diversity of contemporary sociology of science, which has its origins in the late 60s and early 70s, both in Mulkay's pioneering work and in that of the Edinburgh School of Barnes, Bloor and Edge, as well as in the Bath School of Collins and Pinch, which partly succeeded and partly paralleled his own work. He therefore remains an important figure who pioneered reflexive studies and epistemological diversity. He is perhaps best known for his work on discursive analysis of science and his more recent publications on issues surrounding human embryology.

In recent years, he has devoted more of his time to basket weaving, entering his intricate work at various exhibitions for local artists in East Yorkshire.

Selected bibliography

Books

Chapters in books

Journal articles

References

External links
 45 years of Sociology at York University

1936 births
Alumni of the University of Aberdeen
Alumni of the University of Cambridge
Alumni of the University of York
British sociologists
Living people
Sociologists of science
Medical sociologists
Science and technology studies scholars